Balacra micromacula is a moth of the  family Erebidae. It was described by Strand in 1920. It is found in Ghana.

References

Balacra
Moths described in 1920
Erebid moths of Africa